The Albanian Football Association (FSHF) is the governing body of football in Albania. The association is based in Tirana, Albania. It organises the national football leagues of the Albanian Superliga, the First Division, the Second Division, the Third Division, the Albanian Cup and Supercup. Albania women's national football team, Albanian women's football championship, and the Albanian Women's Cup are also overseen. The association also coordinates the activities of the Albania national football team and the Albania national youth football teams such as Under-21, Under-20, Under-19, Under-18, Under-17, Under-16 and Under-15.

History
The Football Association of Albania was established on 6 June 1930 and joined FIFA in 1932 during the congress 12 – 16 June. The association was one of the founding members of UEFA in 1954.

On 14 March 2008, FSHF were suspended by FIFA for "heavy political interference." This means their national teams were banned from playing official matches, representatives banned from official events, and referees unable to officiate FIFA-sanctioned matches. The ban was subsequently lifted as the political interferences were clarified, and on 27 May 2008, Albania played a friendly against Poland.

The current president of FSHF, Armand Duka, has been at this position since 2002 and won the elections for a third term in 2010.

During the 2009 controversy between FSHF and the Albanian government as to the property of the Qemal Stafa Stadium. UEFA insisted in lobbying that the stadium be given to FSHF ownership so that investments on it can be made. In February 2011 it was decided that the new stadium, which will replace the current one and will cost 60M Euro, will be 75% of FSHF and 25% of the Albanian government.

Offices

Tirana 
Durrës 
Shkodër

Presidents

Current sponsorships
 Vodafone Albania
 Macron
 SIGAL
 Tepelenë
 Zenith
 Ama
 Unionbank
 Vas Tour

See also
 Albania national football team
 Football in Albania

References

External links 
National Football Association - FSHF
FSHF Statutes, 2009
FSHF Documentary about Albania football history
Albaniasoccer
Albania at FIFA site
Albania at UEFA site
National football teams
Weltfussball
Albania Sport
albaniansport.net

Albania
Football in Albania
Futsal in Albania
Football
Sports organizations established in 1930
1930 establishments in Albania
Sport in Tirana